Ekranoplan is the second studio album by American psychedelic rock band Assemble Head in Sunburst Sound, released in March 2007 on Tee Pee Records.

Track list
 "Ekranoplan" – 3:17
 "Mosquito Lantern" – 3:51
 "Rudy on the Corner" – 3:44
 "Summon the Vardig" – 6:09
 "Occult Roots" – 4:15
 "Message by Mistral and Thunderclap" – 3:45
 "D. Brown" – 5:36
 "The Chocolate Maiden's Misty Summer Morning" – 4:15
 "Gemini 9" – 3:29

References

2007 albums
Assemble Head in Sunburst Sound albums
Tee Pee Records albums